The Confidence Man is a 1924 American silent romantic comedy film directed by Victor Heerman. Its duration is about 80 minutes and it stars Thomas Meighan and Virginia Valli. It was produced by Famous Players-Lasky and distributed
by Paramount Pictures.

Plot
As described in a film magazine review, Dan Corvan and Larry Maddox, backed by fake promoter Wade, visit Fairfield to sell worthless stock to the town miser, Godfred Queritt. Corvan's suave personality impresses the townsfolk and pretty Margaret Leland. Queritt buys the stock. Wade arrives and quarrels with Corvan. An old lady inmate of the poorhouse sends for Corvan and entrusts him with money stolen by her son, which she wants turned over to its owner. This breaks Corvan down and he resolves to go straight. He beats up Wade, makes restitution to Querritt, and confesses all to Margaret, who then admits that she loves him.

Cast

Preservation
With no copies of The Confidence Man located in any film archives, it is a lost film.

References

External links

Lobby cards at moviestillsdb.com

1924 crime drama films
American crime drama films
Films directed by Victor Heerman
1924 films
American black-and-white films
American silent feature films
Lost American films
Paramount Pictures films
1924 lost films
1920s American films
Silent American drama films